Grade I, Grade II* and notable Grade II (having a separate Wikipedia entry) listed buildings in the metropolitan boroughs of Knowsley, Liverpool, Sefton, St Helens and Wirral in Merseyside.

There are over 5000 listed buildings in Merseyside, and approximately half a million in England and Wales.

Knowsley

Grade I
 Knowsley Hall
 Prescot Museum
 Prescot Parish Church

Grade II*
 Huyton Hey
 St Chad's Church

Grade II
Approximately 100 buildings are listed

Liverpool

Grade I
 Albert Dock
 Dock Traffic Office
 Warehouse A
 Warehouse B & C
 Warehouse D
 Warehouse E
 Bank of England
 Bluecoat Chambers
 Church of All Hallows
 All Saints' Church
 St Agnes' Church
 Church of St Clare
 Church of St John Baptist
 Liverpool Cathedral
 Old Bluecoat School (railings, gates and gate piers)
 The Oratory
 Oriel Chambers
 Princes Road Synagogue
 Royal Liver Building
 St George's Church, Everton
 St George's Hall
 St Michael's Church, Aigburth
 Speke Hall
 Town Hall
 Toxteth Unitarian Chapel
 Unitarian Chapel
 Unitarian Church Hall
 Woolton Hall

Grade II*
 The Albany, Old Hall Street
 Albion House
 Allerton Hall
 Allerton Priory
 Martins Bank Building, 4 Water Street
 Bishop Eton Monastery and Lodge
 Bluecoat School and Chapel
 Broughton Hall
 Carfax, St Michael's Road
 The Carriage House, St Michael's Road
 Chapel of St Patrick, Park Place
 Church of Holy Trinity and War Memorial in yard
 Church of St Andrew
 Church of St Anne
 Church of St Bridget
 Church of St Christopher, Lorenzo Drive
 Church of St Clement
 Church of St Dunstan
 Church of Saint Francis Xavier
 Church of St James
 Church of St Matthew and St James
 Church of St Mary
 Church of St Paul
 Church of St Margaret
 The Cloisters, St Michael's Road
 College of Technology and Museum Extension
 16 Cook Street
 Co-operative Bank, Castle Street
 Croxteth Hall and Stable Block
 Croxteth Park Dairy, Laundry and Laundry Cottage
 Cunard Building
 159, 161, 163, 169, 171, 173 and 175 Duke Street
 Edge Hill Station (Ranges on North and South Side and Engine House)
 Fowler's Building
 The Friary or The Glebelands, St Michael's Road
 1-10 Gambier Terrace
 The Hermitage, St Michael's Road
 98, 100, 102 and 102a High Street
 Liverpool Airport - Control Tower and Terminal, Hangar 1, International Terminal
 Liverpool Collegiate School
 Liverpool Medical Institution
 Liverpool Metropolitan Cathedral
 The Lyceum
 Much Woolton Old School
 Municipal Buildings
 National Westminster Bank
 Nelson Monument
 The Old Court House
 Liverpool Olympia, West Derby Road
 Orleans House, Edmund Street
 Palm House, Sefton Park
 8-32 (even) Percy Street
 Liverpool Philharmonic Hall
 The Philharmonic Dining Rooms
 Picton Reading Room and Hornby Library
 Playhouse Theatre (old part)
 Port of Liverpool Building
 Princes Park
 Princes Road Synagogue
 Royal Insurance Building
 St Agnes' Vicarage, Ullet Road
 St. Bride's Church
 St James Mount and Gardens
 Saint Joseph's Home and Lodge
 St Nicholas Place (Memorial to "heroes of the engine room")
 St. Peter's Church, Woolton
 St Philip Neri Church
 Sefton Park
 Sessions House
 Stanlawe Grange and the Granary
 Stanley Dock (warehouse on north side)
 Steble Fountain
 Sugar Silo, Regent Road
 Tower Buildings
 Tue Brook House
 University Hostel, Greenbank Lane
 Village Cross, West Derby
 The Vines Public House, Lime Street
 Walker Art Gallery
 Wapping Dock (warehouse)
 Wellington Rooms (Irish Centre)
 Wellington's Column
 William Brown Library

Grade II
Over 2400 buildings are listed, including:

 Anfield Cemetery
 Bramley-Moore Dock
 Calderstones House
 Canning Dock
 Canning Half Tide Dock
 Church of Our Lady and Saint Nicholas
 Church of St Luke
 Cressington Station
 Everton Cemetery
 Greek Orthodox Church of St Nicholas
 Greenbank House
 Hope Street (numerous listings)
 Hunts Cross Station
 India Buildings
 Liverpool Empire Theatre
 Liverpool Royal Infirmary
 Liverpool Institute for Boys
 Liverpool Lime Street Station
 Midland Railway Goods Offices
 Nelson Dock
 Neptune Theatre
 North Western Hotel
 Norwegian Fishermans' Church
 Rodney Street (over 60 listings)
 Royal Court Theatre
 St Mary of the Angels
 St. Peter's Roman Catholic Church
 Stanley Dock
 Stanley Dock Tobacco Warehouse
 Sudley House
 Toxteth Park Cemetery
 Victoria Building
 West Derby Cemetery

see also Listed buildings in Liverpool

Sefton
Over 565 buildings are listed, of which two are Grade I and twenty-two Grade II*.

Grade I
 St Helens Church, Sefton
 Church of St Monica, Bootle

Grade II*
 Scotch Piper, Lydiate

Grade II

Borough of St Helens

Grade I
 Sankey Viaduct

Grade II*
 Birchley Hall
 Church of St Aiden
 159, 161, 163 Crow Lane East, Newton Le Willows
 Entrance Archway to Randall's Nursery
 Guildhall Farmhouse
 Tank House
 Scholes House and adjacent Ruins and nearby Effigy Pedestal
 Old Hall Farm
 Manor Farmhouse
 Statue of Queen Victoria
 Ruins of Windleshaw Chantry (a.k.a. Windleshaw Abbey)

Grade II
131 Buildings are listed

Wirral
Approximately 1600 buildings are listed in total including:

Grade I

 Birkenhead Priory
 Hamilton Square (the country's largest group of Grade I buildings)

Grade II*

 Birkenhead Priory (part)
 St Peter's Church, Heswall

Grade II

 Hulme Hall, Port Sunlight
 St Mary's Church, Eastham
 Port Sunlight, about 900 buildings
 St Hilary's Church, Wallasey

External links
Knowsley Council (detailed)
Liverpool Council (summary) (detailed)
Sefton Council (summary)
 St Helens Council (summary)  (detailed)
Wirral Council (summary)

 
.
B
Listed buildings in Liverpool